"The Pleasure Seekers" is a song recorded by American band The System. The song, written by Mic Murphy, David Frank, was released in 1985 by Mirage Records. The song is also included in their 1985 album The Pleasure Seekers. The song was mixed by Tom Lord-Alge.

"The Pleasure Seekers" reached #22 on the Club Play Singles and #21 on  the Black Singles  charts.

Track listing

1985 release  
12" vinyl
 US: Mirage / 0-96875

Personnel 
 Producer: Mic Murphy, David Frank
 Songwriter: Mic Murphy, David Frank
 Produced by Mic Murphy and David Frank for Science Lab Productions. 
 Mixing: Tom Lord-Alge

Chart performance

References 

1985 singles
The System (band) songs
Songs written by David Frank (musician)
Songs written by Mic Murphy
1985 songs
Mirage Records singles
Atlantic Records singles
Dance-pop songs